Modern Arabic mathematical notation is a mathematical notation based on the Arabic script, used especially at pre-university levels of education. Its form is mostly derived from Western notation, but has some notable features that set it apart from its Western counterpart. The most remarkable of those features is the fact that it is written from right to left following the normal direction of the Arabic script. Other differences include the replacement of the Greek and Latin alphabet letters for symbols with Arabic letters and the use of Arabic names for functions and relations.

Features
It is written from right to left following the normal direction of the Arabic script. Other differences include the replacement of the Latin alphabet letters for symbols with Arabic letters and the use of Arabic names for functions and relations.
The notation exhibits one of the very few remaining vestiges of non-dotted Arabic scripts, as dots over and under letters (i'jam) are usually omitted.
Letter cursivity (connectedness) of Arabic is also taken advantage of, in a few cases, to define variables using more than one letter. The most widespread example of this kind of usage is the canonical symbol for the radius of a circle , which is written using the two letters nūn and qāf. When variable names are juxtaposed (as when expressing multiplication) they are written non-cursively.

Variations
Notation differs slightly from region to another. In tertiary education, most regions use the Western notation. The notation mainly differs in numeral system used, and in mathematical symbol used.

Numeral systems 
There are three numeral systems used in right to left mathematical notation.
"Western Arabic numerals" (sometimes called European) are used in western Arabic regions (e.g. Morocco)
"Eastern Arabic numerals" are used in middle and eastern Arabic regions (e.g. Egypt and Syria)
"Eastern Arabic-Indic numerals" are used in Persian and Urdu speaking regions (e.g. Iran, Pakistan, India)

Written numerals are arranged with their lowest-value digit to the right, with higher value positions added to the left. That is identical to the arrangement used by Western texts using Hindu-Arabic numerals even though Arabic script is read from right to left. The symbols "٫" and  "٬"  may be used as the decimal mark and the thousands separator respectively when writing with Eastern Arabic numerals, e.g.  3.14159265358,  1,000,000,000. Negative signs are written to the left of magnitudes, e.g.  −3. In-line fractions are written with the numerator and denominator on the left and right of the fraction slash respectively, e.g.  2/7.

Mirrored Latin symbols

Sometimes, symbols used in Arabic mathematical notation differ according to the region:

   nūn-hāʾ-ʾalif is derived from the first three letters of Arabic   nihāya "limit".
   ḥadd is Persian for "limit".

Sometimes, mirrored Latin symbols are used in Arabic mathematical notation (especially in western Arabic regions):

   is derived from Arabic  maǧmūʿ "sum".

However, in Iran, usually Latin symbols are used.

Examples

Mathematical letters

Mathematical constants and units

Sets and number systems

Arithmetic and algebra

Trigonometric and hyperbolic functions

Trigonometric functions

Hyperbolic functions
The letter  ( zayn, from the first letter of the second word of  "hyperbolic function") is added to the end of trigonometric functions to express hyperbolic functions. This is similar to the way  is added to the end of trigonometric functions in Latin-based notation.

Inverse trigonometric functions
For inverse trigonometric functions, the superscript  in Arabic notation is similar in usage to the superscript  in Latin-based notation.

Inverse hyperbolic functions

Calculus

Complex analysis

See also
Mathematical notation
Arabic Mathematical Alphabetic Symbols

References

External links
 Multilingual mathematical e-document processing
 Arabic mathematical notation - W3C Interest Group Note.
 Arabic math editor - by WIRIS.

Mathematical notation
Arabic, modern